The blue-eyed cuscus (Phalanger matabiru) is a species of marsupial in the family Phalangeridae. It is endemic to the two small islands of Ternate and Tidore, west of the island of Halmahera in North Maluku province, Indonesia.

References

Possums
Mammals of Indonesia
Mammals described in 1995